Otokar Arma is a 6x6 and 8x8 amphibious wheeled armoured combat vehicle family designed and developed by Otokar. The vehicle is a modular multi-wheel configurable with a monocoque steel hull.

Development
Otokar developed the vehicle to target the Turkish Land Forces’ Special Purpose Tactical Wheeled Armoured Vehicle (Özel Maksatlı Taktik Tekerlekli Zırhlı Araç, ÖMTTZA) project. It is competing against two other vehicles in the shape of FNSS Defence Systems’ Pars and HEMA Endustri's Anafarta, a variant of Patria's 6×6 Armoured Modular Vehicle. Turkish Land Forces are expected to make a selection for its OMTTZA requirement by mid-2010 and subsequently procure 336 vehicles in a variety of versions: 30 for NBC reconnaissance, 36 radar carriers, 108 sensor carriers, 39 command vehicles and 108 fire-support vehicles, which could be armed with a manually operated 20mm cannon. Mobility tests with prototypes to date have included around 10,000 km of running over varied terrain.

Otokar presented for the first time to the public the Arma wheeled armoured vehicle at Eurosatory 2010. Arma is a new product family within Otokar's tactical wheeled armoured vehicle range with modular multi-wheel configuration. Arma vehicle's development started in 2007 as a company-funded development project for home and export markets.

Development studies from concept design till the end of test phases including qualification and validation processes, detailed design, and computer-aided engineering studies, are performed by Otokar. Turkish leading land systems manufacturer, Otokar received the first contract for its new 6x6 tactical armoured vehicle Arma from abroad. The contract is valued at over $10.6 million including the vehicles, spare parts and training. Deliveries under this contract award are expected to be completed in 15 months. In June 2011, Otokar has been awarded a $63.2 million second contract for its new 6x6 tactical armoured vehicle Arma.

Service History 
During the Saudi Arabian-led intervention in the Yemeni Civil War, Bahrain deployed a mechanized company equipped with the 6x6 Arma.

Variants

Rabdan
In 2016, Otokar teamed up with Emirati company Al Jasoor to develop a new 8x8 vehicle for the United Arab Emirates Army. Al Jasoor, which is a joint company between Otokar UAE (49%) and Tawazun Holdings (51%), was established to create and develop a unique variant based on the Arma 8x8 called Rabdan in the United Arab Emirates. The Rabdan was created to replace the United Arab Emirates Army BMP-3 Infantry fighting vehicles. Al Jasoor Rabdan and Otokar Arma are different in multiple ways. The Rabdan is heavier at 28 tons (vs Arma 24 tons) and has a length and width of 15 cm and 55 cm. The Rabdan also provides small arms fire protection of up to STANAG 4569 Level 4 and mine blast protection of up to STANAG Level 4a and Level 4b.

Since the Rabdan was created to replace the BMP-3, the BMP-3 turrets are also configurable on the Rabdan. The Rabdan is equipped with a 100-mm 2A70 semi-automatic rifled gun, a 30-mm 2A72 cannon, and a 7.62-mm machine gun.

Al Jasoor is expected to produce up to 700 Rabdans for $661 million for the United Arab Emirates Army.

Design

Armament
There are five different weapon systems that have been used in the Arma. The Mizrak 30 is a 30mm autonomous main gun, which can be controlled by either the gunner or commander from within the vehicle, and comes with a 7.62mm co-axle machine gun. The Mizrak 30 also is high tech, as it comes with digital fire control, stabilized sights (with the sights also having thermal), a laser range finder, etc. The Mizrak S 30 is similar to the Mizrak 30 in fields like armaments and tech, but it has the advantage of being lighter.  

The ÜÇOK turret system is a remote control weapon station, and is a stabilized machine gun platform which can be equipped with either a 12.7 mm machine gun, a 7.62 mm machine gun, or 40 mm automatic grenade launcher. Like both the Mizrak models, the ÜÇOK system can be operated from inside the vehicle, but can also be operated with from without. The ÜÇOK also has similar tech to the Mizrak 30 and Mizrak S 30. 

The BAŞOK system is a remote controlled 7.62 mm machine gun, and also has similar technological features as the Mizraks and the ÜÇOK.

The KESKIN is also a remote-controlled system, which can be operated with a 14.5 mm machine gun, 12.7 mm machine gun, 7.62 mm machine gun, or a 40 mm automatic grenade launcher. It is composed of similar technology to the Mizraks, the ÜÇOK, and the BAŞOK, but also comes with 360º situational awareness.

Protection
No details have been released on its ballistic protection, but since it is required to be amphibious, armouring is not expected to exceed STANAG 4569 Level II. 425 mm ground clearance should help achieve mine protection to Level IIIB or higher. Arma's ballistic and anti-mine protection is provided by high hardness monocoque steel hull and all personnel is seated on anti-mine seats.

Propulsion
The Arma 6x6 is motorized with a 450hp water-cooled turbo diesel capable of running on F-34 or F-54 fuel drives the wheels through an automatic gearbox and single-speed transfer box, giving it a top speed of 105km/h and a power/weight ratio of 24.3hp/tonne. This also powers the onboard 24V direct current DC electrical system, which incorporates two maintenance-free 125 Ah batteries and a 3.3kW converter. Arma's front two axles are steerable enabling it to make a turning radius of 7.85 m and the vehicle rides on independent hydropneumatic suspension, offering respectable off-road mobility and comfort. It can negotiate 45-degree approach and departure angles leading onto 60 percent inclines and 30 percent side-slopes. It can also cross 1.2m-wide trenches and climb over 60 cm obstacles.

Accessories
The Arma can be transported by a Lockheed C-130 Hercules transport plane. Standard equipment of Arma 6x6 includes NBC protection system and air conditioning. Arma can be driven in 6x6 or 6x4 modes depending upon the terrain conditions. The vehicle is amphibious and driven by two hydraulically driven propellers in water, allowing a high seagoing performance with a pivot turn capability.

Operators

 : In 2010, Bahrain procured 73 units for $74 million.
: in 2017 400, Rabdan variants were delivered to United Arab Emirates Army. 700 planned

Potential operators
 : The Turkish company "Otokar" has announced the conclusion of a contract with an unnamed foreign customer for the supply of armoured vehicles worth 30 million dollars.  According to many experts and the Azerbaijani media, the recipient country of armoured vehicles may be Azerbaijan.

References

External links
 Otokar

Armoured cars
Armoured fighting vehicles of Turkey
Arma
Military vehicles introduced in the 2010s
Wheeled armoured personnel carriers
Armoured personnel carriers of the post–Cold War period